Gansevoort–Bellamy Historic District is a national historic district located at Rome in Oneida County, New York, USA. The district includes ten contributing buildings, two contributing structures and two contributing objects. Located within the district are the former Rome City Hall, U.S. Post Office, Oneida County Courthouse and St. Peter's Catholic Church.

It was listed on the National Register of Historic Places in 1975.

References

External links

Historic districts on the National Register of Historic Places in New York (state)
Historic districts in Oneida County, New York
Rome, New York
National Register of Historic Places in Oneida County, New York